The Celluloid Heroes is a four-part Australian documentary series about  the history of the cinema of Australia. The music score was composed by one of Australian composer Nigel Westlake. The original soundtrack recording was performed by the Melbourne Symphony Orchestra and produced for CD by Philip Powers for 1M1 Records.

References

1990s Australian documentary television series
1995 in Australian television
Documentary films about the cinema of Australia
Films directed by Donald Crombie